The Gonorynchiformes  are an order of ray-finned fish that includes the important food source, the milkfish (Chanos chanos, family Chanidae), and a number of lesser-known types, both marine and freshwater.

The alternate spelling "Gonorhynchiformes", with an "h", is frequently seen but not official.

Gonorynchiformes have small mouths and no teeth. They are the sole group in the clade Anotophysi, a subgroup of the superorder Ostariophysi. They are characterized by a primitive Weberian apparatus formed by the first three vertebrae and one or more cephalic ribs within the head. This apparatus is believed to be a hearing organ, and is found in a more advanced and complex form in the related cypriniform fish, such as carp. Also like the cypriniforms, the gonorynchiforms produce a substance from their skin when injured that dissolves into the water and acts an alarm signal to other fish.

Taxonomy 
Although many of the families are rather small, there are several fossil genera. This listing of the groups of Gonorynchiformes includes fossil fish with a short description. They are listed in approximate order of how primitive their characteristics are.
{{cladogram
|title=Phylogeny of living Gonorynchiformes
|{{clade|style=font-size:80%;line-height:100%;width:300px;
|label1=Gonorynchiformes
|1={{clade
  |label1=Gonorynchidae
  |1=Gonorynchus
  |2={{clade
    |label1=Chanidae
    |1=Chanos
    |label2=Kneriidae
    |2={{clade
      |label1=Phractolaeminae
      |1=Phractolaemus 
      |label2=Kneriinae
      |2={{clade
        |1=Kneria        |2=
         }}
       }}
     }}
   }}
 }}
}}

 Order †Sorbininardiformes Taverne 1999
 Family †Sorbininardidae Taverne 1999
 Genus †Sorbininardus Taverne 1999
 Order Gonorynchiformes Regan 1909
 Suborder Gonorynchoidei - beaked sandfishes
 Family †Apulichthyidae Taverne 1997
 Genus †Apulichthys Taverne 1997
 Family Gonorynchidae Fowler 1941
 †Anormurus de Blainville 1818
 †Chanopsis Casier 1961
 †Charitopsis Gayet 1993 non Trjapitzin 1969
 †Gonorynchidarum otolith
 †Hakeliosomus Gayet 1993
 †Protocatostomus Whitfield 1891
 †Ramallichthys Gayet 1982
 Subfamily †Charitosominae
 †Charitosomus Hosius & Von Der Marck 1885 - Cretaceous
 Subfamily †Judeichthyinae
 †Judeichthys Gayet 1985
 Subfamily Gonorynchinae
 †Notogoneus Cope 1885 - from North America, Europe, Australia; some freshwater; Late Cretaceous to Oligocene
 Gonorynchus Gronow 1763 ex Scopoli 1777
 Suborder Chanoidei Berg 1937
 †Aethalinopsis Gaudant 1967 - Early Cretaceous.
 Family Chanidae Günther 1868 (milkfishes)
 Subfamily †Rubiesichthyinae Poyata-Ariza 1996
 Genus †Gordichthys Poyata-Ariza 1994- Early Cretaceous Chanid
 Genus †Nanaichthys Amaral & Brito 2012
 Genus †Rubiesichthys Wenz 1984 - Early Cretaceous Chanid
 Subfamily Chaninae
 Genus Chanos Lacépède 1803
 Genus †Dastilbe Jordan 1910 - Early Cretaceous Chanid
 Genus †Parachanos Arambourg & Schneegans 1935 - Early Cretaceous Chanid
 Genus †Tharrhias Jordan & Branner 1908 - Early Cretaceous Chanid
 Suborder Knerioidei
 Family Kneriidae Günther 1868
 Genus †Mahengichthys Davis, Arratia & Kaiser 2013
 Subfamily Kneriinae (Shellears)
 Tribe Cromeriini
 Genus Cromeria Boulenger 1901
 Genus Grasseichthys Géry 1964
 Tribe Kneriini
 Genus Kneria Steindachner 1866 
 Genus Parakneria Poll 1965
 Family Phractolaemidae
 Genus Phractolaemus'' Boulenger 1901 (Hingemouths/snake mudheads)

Timeline of genera

References 

 

 
Extant Early Cretaceous first appearances
Ray-finned fish orders
Taxa named by Lev Berg